PDHS may refer to:
 Palm Desert High School, Palm Desert, California, United States
 Pakistan Demographic and Health Survey
 Paris District High School, Paris, Ontario, Canada
 Pugwash District High School, Pugwash, Nova Scotia, Canada